Bankeryd Church is a church in Bankeryd in Sweden. Belonging to Bankeryd Parish of the Church of Sweden, it was inaugurated on 30 August 1868.

References

External links

19th-century Church of Sweden church buildings
Churches completed in 1868
1868 establishments in Sweden